Kahnshuiyeh (also Romanized as Kahnshū’īyeh; also known as Kahn Gashū’īyeh, Kahngeshū’īyeh, Kohneh Shū’īyeh, and Kohneshū’īyeh) is a village in Berentin Rural District, Bikah District, Rudan County, Hormozgan Province, Iran. At the 2006 census, its population was 1,013, in 205 families.

References 

Populated places in Rudan County